Marsden railway station serves the village of Marsden near Huddersfield in West Yorkshire, England. It was opened in 1849 by the London & North Western Railway and is the last station before the West Yorkshire boundary with Greater Manchester. The station is operated by Northern Trains, but only Transpennine Express trains call here.

Description
The station has three platforms which have each their own entrance and exit.  Platforms 1 and 2 (which were once an island platform) are accessed by separate flights of stairs from the road over bridge which crosses the line to the west of the station.  Platform 3 is accessed from the same road by a bridge across the nearby canal.  Only platform 3 (which was built on the former Up Goods Loop in the mid-1980s by British Rail) has step-free access to the street.  Other than simple shelters on the platforms, there are no station buildings and the station is unmanned.  Train running information can be obtained via digital information screens, timetable posters and telephone.

The station did have two additional platforms up until the mid-1960s (the current platform 2 having an outer face, with the fourth side platform standing where platform 3 is now) when the line was quadruple all the way from Huddersfield to Diggle Junction, but these were decommissioned when the main line was reduced to two tracks in 1966.  The station avoided closure in the wake of the 1968 cutbacks that claimed many others on this section of route, but for some years acted as the terminus for local stopping trains from the Leeds direction (hence the provision of signalling that allows trains to start back east from platforms 2 & 3) and had no regular service towards Stalybridge and Manchester.

The tunnel entrance, with its exhibition and boat trips, can easily be reached by walking along the towpath of the Huddersfield Narrow Canal, which runs adjacent to the station. The station's former goods yard is now the headquarters of the National Trust's Marsden Moor Estate, and the goods shed contains a public exhibition, Welcome to Marsden, which gives an overview of the area and its transport history.

There was formerly another area of sidings situated to the south of the railway and canal, to the west of the station, which was originally built to accommodate the heavy traffic generated during the building of the reservoirs in the nearby Wessenden Valley.  The steeply graded Huddersfield Corporation Waterworks Railway connected these sidings to the reservoir works.  The area is now a heavily wooded country park, but an abutment of the long demolished bridge by which the waterworks railway crossed the River Colne can still be found amongst the vegetation.

Services
All other TransPennine Express services pass through at high speed and do not stop. There is an hourly service between Sheffield and Manchester Piccadilly on Sundays only.

While Northern Trains operate the station, Northern services do not call here.

21st Century upgrade
As part of the Transpennine Route Upgrade, the station is being modified and the line through it electrified. The section between Stalybridge to Huddersfield is being split up as follows:  

 W2b – Stalybridge to Marsden
 W2c – Marsden to Huddersfield

References

External links

A walk between Marsden Station and Standedge Tunnel from TripsByTrain.com

Railway stations in Kirklees
DfT Category F1 stations
Former London and North Western Railway stations
Railway stations in Great Britain opened in 1849
Railway stations served by TransPennine Express
1849 establishments in England
railway station
Railway stations in Great Britain not served by their managing company